Chris Warren III (born June 6, 1996) is a former American football running back. He played college football at University of Texas and signed with the Oakland Raiders as an undrafted free agent in 2018.

Early years and college career
Warren was a high school All-American running back, attending the University of Texas. There he set their single-game freshman rushing record with 276 yards and four touchdowns against Texas Tech University late in 2015. In 2017 he was moved to tight end. Going in to the combine he told teams he would do whatever they needed him to, but that he fully intended to play running back in the NFL.

Professional career

Warren went undrafted in the 2018 NFL Draft and signed with the Oakland Raiders as an undrafted free agent on May 7, 2018. After a strong preseason, Warren was placed on injured reserve on September 1, 2018 with a knee injury.

On July 28, 2019, Warren was waived by the Raiders.

Personal life
He is the son of former Seattle Seahawks running back Chris Warren.

References

External links
Oakland Raiders bio

1996 births
Living people
American football return specialists
American football running backs
Oakland Raiders players
People from Rockwall, Texas
Players of American football from Texas
Sportspeople from the Dallas–Fort Worth metroplex
Texas Longhorns football players